Argyrotaenia burroughsi is a species of moth of the family Tortricidae. It is found in the United States, where it has been recorded from Colorado, Arizona and New Mexico.

The wingspan is about 17 mm. The forewings are pale ocherous to silvery white, with ferruginous markings. The hindwings are glossy white, in some specimens with a slight ocherous tint. Adults have been recorded on wing in March and from July to August.

References

B
Moths of North America
Fauna of the Southwestern United States
Moths described in 1961